Saint Louis University Office of Admissions Building (as known as The Alexander Euston Mansion and Queen's Daughters House) is a stone castle building located at 3730 Lindell in St. Louis, Missouri.  This mansion was built in 1890 by English immigrant Alexander Euston who made money in the white lead and linseed oil business.  It was built to include sixteen rooms and a ballroom.

In 1912, the St. Louis-based religious society Daughters of the Queen of Heaven, an organization of lay Catholic women, purchased this building and converted it to a boarding house for single women.  It functioned as a woman's home until 1972. The Church of Scientology owned the building between 1974 and 1985.  In 1988, Saint Louis University acquired the mansion and converted it to its Office of Admissions Building.  The building is one of the best remaining examples of Romanesque Revival architecture left in the city of St. Louis. Another house of Romanesque architectural style on the campus of Saint Louis University would be Samuel Cupples House.

References

Houses in St. Louis
Romanesque Revival architecture in Missouri
Saint Louis University